The Story of the Blues (1959) is an album by singer and actress Della Reese. It is a concept album about the history of the blues. Before each song, there is a small spoken narrative by Reese.

Track listing

 "The Story of the Blues"
 "Good Morning Blues"
 "Empty Bed Blues"
 "Squeeze Me"
 "You've Been a Good Old Wagon"
 "Sent for you Yesterday (And Here You Come Today)"
 "St. James Infirmary"
 "Lover Man"
 "Things Ain't What They Used to Be"
 "Stormy Weather"
 "There's Always the Blues"

References

Della Reese albums
Big band albums
Jubilee Records albums
1959 albums
Blues albums by American artists